libcamera is an open-source software library for image signal processors and embedded cameras on Linux distributions such as Android, ChromeOS and Ubuntu.

Background 
Nokia originally wanted to create a plugin based software project for camera support, but this was cancelled because they stopped development of Linux based smartphones.

References

Further reading

External links 
 

Free computer libraries